Piscataquis Community High School is a high school located in Guilford, Maine, United States. The school serves students from Abbot, Cambridge, Guilford, Parkman, Sangerville, and Wellington.

References

External links

Public high schools in Maine
Schools in Piscataquis County, Maine
Guilford, Maine